Krishna Chandran (born 24 August 1984), also known as Krishna Chandran Karate, is an Indian-born cricketer who played for the United Arab Emirates national cricket team. He has played in twelve One Day International matches, including five matches in the World Cup. He represents Kerala cricket team in Domestic Cricket and became the first and only Keralite to represent United Arab Emirates national cricket team.

References

External links
 

1984 births
Living people
People from Palakkad district
Emirati cricketers
United Arab Emirates One Day International cricketers
Cricketers at the 2015 Cricket World Cup
Cricketers from Kerala
Indian cricketers
Indian emigrants to the United Arab Emirates
Indian expatriate sportspeople in the United Arab Emirates